Sepahan Oil Company (SOC), established in 2002, is an oil refining independent company based in Tehran with its refining facilities located in Isfahan.
In 2013, SOC began offering shares of stock on Tehran Stock Exchange. 
With the annual production capacity of more than 700,000 MT, SOC is now the largest producer of base oil in the Middle East. Under the brand name of Speedy, the company is one of the main producers of diesel and engine oils in the Mideast as well.

Products
SOC's primary products include engine oil, industrial lubricant, automobile gear oil, grease and antifreeze, paraffin, and heavy slackwax, as well as base oil SN500.

Certifications
The company has been awarded nationally and internationally. It has received Iran's Best Exporter of the Year Awards in 1383 (2004), 1386 (2007), 1390 (2011), 1391 (2012) and in 1393 (2014), as well as Iran Best Industrial Co. Award in 1383 (2004). It received the Golden Award for Quality & Business Prestige in 2007 (Geneva, Switzerland), a vanity award, as well as the "Golden Trophy for Quality -- New Millennium Award" in 2007 (Paris, France) and Premium Quality Award from the ICS Group in Canada in 2014 and the International Risk Control Academy's (IRCA's) two-star certificate for the year 2015-2016 as the first company in Iran.
Nationally awarded for its environmentally-friendly activities in the Iranian calendar year of 1393 (2014), SOC has also been accredited by ISO 9001, ISO/TS 16949, OHSAS 18001, ISO/TS 29001, and ISO 14001 as well as ISO/IEC 17025. It has also succeeded for the first time to receive the Iranian national certificate for protecting consumers' rights in 2016.

Shareholder

1- Taban Farda Petrochemical Group Company - Public Joint Stock Company

2- Taban Farda Petrochemical Group Company - General Joint Stock Company

3- Taban Farda Investment Company

4- State Pension Fund Company - Public Joint Stock Company

5- Eurasian Economic Tadbirgaran Company

See also

Industry of Iran
Privatization in Iran
List of Iranian companies
National Iranian Oil Company

References

External links 

 

Oil and gas companies of Iran
Isfahan
Companies listed on the Tehran Stock Exchange
Oil refineries in Iran
Iranian brands